Chionanthus pubicalyx grows as a tree up to  tall, with a trunk diameter of up to . The bark is whitish or grey. The fragrant flowers are white or pale yellow. Habitat is forests from sea level to  altitude. C. pubicalyx is endemic to Borneo.

References

pubicalyx
Endemic flora of Borneo
Trees of Borneo
Plants described in 1936